The 2007 NCAA Women's Gymnastics championship involved 12 schools competing for the national championship of women's NCAA Division I gymnastics.  It was the twenty sixth NCAA gymnastics national championship and the defending NCAA Team Champion for 2006 was Georgia.  The Competition took place in Salt Lake City, Utah hosted by the University of Utah in the Jon M. Huntsman Center. The 2007 Championship was won by Georgia, their third in a row.

Champions

References

External links
 NCAA Gymnastics Championship Official site

NCAA Women's Gymnastics championship
2007 in women's gymnastics